William Foster Barham (22 October 1802 – 28 January 1845) was an English poet.

Barham was the third son of Thomas Barham Foster. He was born at Marazion, in Cornwall, 22 October 1802. He was educated in the grammar schools of Bodmin and Leeds, and then proceeded to Trinity College, Cambridge. His family's wealth came from slavery on sugar estates in western Jamaica.

He won the Porson Prize in 1821 and 1822, and graduated B.A. in 1824 as twenty-second senior optime, second in the first class of the classical tripos, and second chancellor's medallist. He went out M.A. in 1827. His death occurred in Kent on 28 January 1845.

He was the author of an unpublished poem on Moskow. His Greek versions of portions of Othello and Julius Cæsar are printed in a volume of Translations which have obtained the Porson Prize from 1817 to 1856, 2nd edit., Camb. 1857, pp. 16–23.

References

1802 births
1845 deaths
19th-century English poets
People from Marazion
Alumni of Trinity College, Cambridge
English male poets
19th-century English male writers